Election of the President of the Senate of the Czech Republic was held on 21 November 2012. Milan Štěch was reelected for his second term.

Background and voting 
Czech Social Democratic Party has won 2012 Senate election. Party's gains gave Milan Štěch strong position to be reelected as the President of the Senate. Party nominated him as the only candidate.

Voting took place on 21 November 2012. Štěch received 74 votes of 79.

References

2012 elections in the Czech Republic
1996
November 2012 events in Europe